Green Island Light may refer to:
 Green Island Light (Ohio) in Lake Erie
 Green Island Light (Wisconsin) in Green Bay, Wisconsin
 Green Island Lighthouse Compound in Hong Kong
 Lyudao Lighthouse in Taiwan